In response theory, the quality of an excited system is related to the number of excitation frequencies to which it can respond. In the case of a homogeneous, isotropic system, the quality is proportional to the FWHM.

This sense of the phrase is the precursor of the usage of the word in music theory. In music theory, quality is the number of harmonics of a fundamental frequency of an instrument (the higher the quality, the richer the sound).

See also 
 Q factor

Physical quantities